Feel No Fade is a studio album by American rock band Push King. It was released in 2001 by Le Grand Magistery.

Track listing

References

2001 albums
Le Grand Magistery albums